Lepiota castanea, commonly known as the chestnut dapperling, is a deadly poisonous, uncommon, gilled mushroom of the genus Lepiota in the order Agaricales. It is known to contain amatoxins and consuming this fungus can be a potentially lethal proposition. It was described by French mycologist Lucien Quélet in 1881.

It has white gills and spores. They typically have rings on the stems, which in larger fungi are detachable and glide up and down the stem.

It can be found in coniferous and deciduous woodlands, mostly singly or in small groups.

Description

The cap is broadly bell shaped to flat, dark red-brown; soon splitting and scaly, up to 3 cm in diameter.
The spores and flesh are white, with a mild taste. The stem is typically chestnut brown.

Toxicity

Like several other species of the genus Lepiota, it contains amatoxins which can result in severe liver toxicity.

See also
List of deadly fungi
List of Lepiota species

References

E. Garnweidner. Mushrooms and Toadstools of Britain and Europe. Collins. 1994.

castanea
Deadly fungi
Poisonous fungi
Fungi of Europe
Fungi described in 1881
Taxa named by Lucien Quélet